The Prairie River is a river in Itasca County, Minnesota.  The river is located in northern Minnesota, near the communities of Taconite, Bovey, Grand Rapids, and La Prairie.  It is a tributary of the Mississippi River.

In 1991 Enbridge's Line 3 pipeline ruptured near Grand Rapids, spilling 1.7 million of gallons of oil into the area, including the river, in the largest inland oil spill in US history.

See also
List of rivers of Minnesota
List of longest streams of Minnesota

References

Rivers of Minnesota
Tributaries of the Mississippi River
Rivers of Itasca County, Minnesota